Yohanan Aharoni (Hebrew:יוחנן אהרוני)(7 June 1919 – 9 February 1976) was an Israeli archaeologist and historical geographer, chairman of the Department of Near East Studies and chairman of the Institute of Archaeology at Tel-Aviv University.

Life
Born to the Aronheim family, in Germany on 7 June 1919, Aharoni immigrated to Mandatory Palestine in 1933. He studied at the Hebrew Reali School in Haifa, and later at the Mikve Yisrael agricultural school. He married Miriam Gross and became a member of kibbutz Alonim.

Career
Aharoni studied archaeology at the Hebrew University of Jerusalem and began to teach there in 1954. By 1966, he became a professor at the university. However, in 1968, he moved to Tel-Aviv University and became chairman of the Department of Near East Studies and chairman of the Institute of Archaeology.

Aharoni participated in many excavations, including Ramat Rachel, Tel Arad, Tel Be'er Sheva, Tel Hazor and Lachish. He also studied ancient roadways in the Negev, and participated in the discovery of the Bar Kokhba caves while surveying and excavating the Dead Sea region in 1953.

Publications
In addition to numerous articles published in archaeological journals, Aharoni wrote several books:

 The Land of the Bible: A Historical Geography (1967); original Hebrew edition: 'Land of Israel in Biblical Times - Historical Geography', Bialik Institute (1962)
 Beer-Sheba I: Excavations at Tel Beer-Sheba , 1969-1971 (1973) 
 Investigations at Lachish: The sanctuary and the residency  (1975) 
 The Arad Inscriptions with Joseph Naveh (1981) - English version
 Macmillan Bible Atlas with Michael Avi-Yonah (1993) 
 Carta Bible Atlas (2002)
 The Archaeology of the Land of Israel (1978)

References

External links
 Rainey, Anson F. "In Memoriam: Yohanan Aharoni" The Biblical Archaeologist, Vol. 39, No. 2 (May, 1976), pp. 53–54 JSTOR

1919 births
1976 deaths
People from Frankfurt (Oder)
People from the Province of Brandenburg
Jewish emigrants from Nazi Germany to Mandatory Palestine
Israeli archaeologists
Academic staff of Tel Aviv University
Hebrew University of Jerusalem alumni
20th-century archaeologists